The Nevill Ranch raid occurred on the night of March 25, 1918, and was the last serious attack on a Texas ranch by Mexican rebels during the Bandit War. It is not certain, but there was reason to believe that Villistas were responsible for the raid in which two people were murdered. Afterwards, the rebels withdrew to the village of Pilares, Chihuahua, in Mexican territory, under pursuit by a group of United States cavalry. A small battle was fought at Pilares on the following day, several more people were killed, and the Americans burned the village before they returned to Texas.

Background
From the beginning of the Mexican Revolution in 1910, raids into Texas by Mexican bandits became very common. After the Brite Ranch Raid, on December 25, 1917, the Big Bend region was on high alert. Three people had been murdered on Christmas day--Villistas from the small border town of Porvenir were thought to be responsible so, on January 27, 1918, Texas Rangers and US Cavalry went to the settlement, surrounded the village, and began searching it.  Later accounts by some of the women of the village, alleged that while the soldiers were checking the houses, the Texas Rangers, under Captain Monroe Fox, gathered up fifteen Mexican men and took them to a nearby hill where they were executed without evidence of their involvement in banditry.  (Archaeological digs in 2015 would suggest the US Cavalry discharged their firearms on the site.)  News of the Porvenir Massacre quickly spread on the Mexican side of the border, leading to some speculation that the attack on Nevill Ranch may have been in retaliation, being that many of the raiders had lived in Porvenir or had family there.

Nevill Ranch was owned by Edwin W. Nevill and located about six miles northwest of Porvenir, along the Rio Grande river. Being isolated, there were no neighbors nearby and the lower ranch complex, where the attack occurred, had no telephone.  Nevill lived there with his wife and 5 children. The day of the raid he was on the ranch with his eldest son, Glenn, as well as his Mexican servant, Rosa Castillo, and her husband and three children. Following the raid at Brite Ranch, Edwin moved his wife, Anna, his son, Thomas and three daughters, Edith, Grace, and Lois to a home in Van Horn.

The Raid
On March 25, 1918, while on garrison duty at Candelaria, Captain Leonard Matlock, 8th Cavalry, received information regarding an imminent attack on Nevill Ranch. Matlock then sent out a patrol, under a Lieutenant Gaines, to warn Edwin. Edwin was not at the ranch at the time, but in Van Horn buying supplies. After hearing these same reports in town, Edwin rode with his son for eight hours straight, back to the ranch.  After arriving back at the ranch to find it unharmed, Edwin gathered with everyone on the ranch in the family house to discuss the rumors about the imminent attack.  At some point Glenn went to check on sounds from outside the house, and when he peered out a window, he saw in the dim light some "fifty approaching horsemen" who then opened fire with small arms.  Providing insufficient cover, the Nevills and Castillos fled the house to a ditch about 300 yards away.  Glenn was shot in the head, and while he lay wounded, the raiders approached and beat him to death with the butts of their rifles. Rosa was also "shot and her body mutilated" as well as sexually assaulted in front of her children while her husband escaped on a pony. After this, the raiders turned to pillaging the ranch of horses, food, clothing, bedding and other supplies. Edwin fled on foot and was later found "wandering" through the desert.

Aftermath
Rosa's husband found Lieutenant Gaines and his patrol six miles away from the ranch and told them what had happened. Gaines then followed the man back to the lower Nevill Ranch, arriving just after the raiders left, and from there he went to the upper ranch to inform his commander, Colonel George Langhorne, by telephone. Colonel Langhorne responded by dispatching Captain Henry H. Anderson and Troop G, 8th Cavalry, from Everett Ranch, an army camp about thirty-four miles north of Candelaria. At the same time, Troop A, 8th Cavalry, was mobilized in Marfa and sent to Valentine by rail. From there they mounted up and set out for Nevill Ranch. By 4:00 pm, on March 26, Captain Anderson had assembled both troops, and a mule train for supplies, at the ranch and he was ready to begin pursuing the raiders. The Americans crossed the Rio Grande into Chihuahua shortly thereafter and quickly found the Mexicans' trail. According to Colonel Langhorne, Anderson and his men followed the Mexicans over rough mountainous country for about seventy miles before the latter "doubled back" and began heading towards Pilares. Unable to escape, the raiders laid an ambush for the cavalrymen near Pilares which turned into a running battle of eleven miles. Langhorne reported that the raiders were reinforced at about that time by people from Pilares and that some Carrancista soldiers may have fought in the battle as well. Langhorne said that after the expedition a Carrancista officer, named Enrique Montova, "boasted he had fought against [the Americans]" and "drove [them] out [of Pilares]" while at the same time "professing to aid [them]."

When the battle was over, Captain Anderson ordered his men to burn all the buildings in Pilares except a single house. His command captured a "substantial cache of weapons", including German-made Mauser rifles, and they also found evidence at the village linking the inhabitants to the raids on Brite and Nevill Ranch. The Americans then returned to Texas, "barely ahead of a larger contingent of Mexican [Carrancista] cavalry." Only one American was killed during the battle at Pilares, Private Carl Alberts. Mexican casualties range from ten to thirty-three killed and another eight wounded. Colonel Langhorne said; "Our soldiers found about 10 dead and found the horses of Nevill and equipment belonging to Nevill's ranch and the boy that had been killed, and probably they killed a great many more than that. There were 29 in the raid, and the report as we checked it up showed there were about 33 killed. We lost Private Albert of A Troop in that fight."

See also
Garza Revolution
Las Cuevas War

References

History of Texas
History of Mexico
20th-century military history of the United States
Conflicts in 1918
1918 in Mexico
Battles of the Mexican Revolution
Battles of the Mexican Revolution involving the United States
American frontier
Military raids
March 1918 events